Neophytus V was Ecumenical Patriarch of Constantinople for a few days in 1707.

Life
Neophytus was appointed Metropolitan of Heraclea on 15 May 1689. The bishops and the laity elected him as Patriarch of Constantinople on 20 October 1707. He was not confirmed however by the Ottoman Sultan, who reserved the right, as previously the Byzantine Emperor, to confirm the election. Thus, in five days, Neophytus was deposed and he remained Metropolitan of Heraclea until 1711, the probable year of his death.

Notes

17th-century births
1711 deaths
18th-century Ecumenical Patriarchs of Constantinople